Agent Howard may refer to:

Special Agent Fritz Howard, fictional character featured in the TNT programs The Closer and Major Crimes
Agent Howard (Haven), fictional character in Haven